The women's pole vault at the 2016 IAAF World Indoor Championships took place on March 17, 2016. Jennifer Suhr of the United States won gold.

The men's and women's pole vault competition were the only events on the opening day.  They were conducted simultaneously with two parallel runways down the center of the arena.  The women's entrants included eight of the top 20 vaulters in history, most of them peaking in the weeks before the competition.  One day after her 35th birthday, Fabiana Murer improved upon the listed Masters W35 world record by clearing 4.60.  At 4.70, Eliza McCartney set her indoor New Zealand National Record, but barely a footnote considering she had cleared 4.80 at her outdoor national championships just 12 days earlier.  She passed her next jump to that same 4.80 mark.  At 4.75, the world record holder (improved earlier this season) Jenn Suhr took only her second attempt of the competition to tie for the lead with Ekaterini Stefanidi, who had jumped clean at 5 heights.  Nicole Büchler missed twice at 4.75 and put all her marbles on a final attempt at a personal best 4.80.  She made it, setting the Swiss National Record.  Sandi Morris also made it on her first attempt and Stefanidi kept her perfect streak going.  At 4.85, Stefanidi and Büchler failed while both Americans Morris and Suhr were successful.  Having nothing to gain at 4.85 Stefanidi and Büchler took their remaining attempts at 4.90.  After everyone else failed at 4.90, Suhr cleared it on only her fourth attempt of the competition which ultimately gave her the gold.  With silver confirmed, Morris took her last attempt at 4.95 but after it failed, Suhr packed up her poles.  Stefanidi's perfect round until 4.80 gave her the bronze.

Records

Qualification standards

Schedule

Results
The final was started at 19:05.

References

Pole vault
Pole vault at the World Athletics Indoor Championships
2016 in women's athletics